The herkie (aka hurkie) is a cheerleading jump named after Lawrence Herkimer, the founder of the National Cheerleaders Association and former cheerleader at Southern Methodist University. It is similar to a side-hurdler and to the abstract double hook, except instead of the bent leg's knee being pointed downward, it should be flat while the other leg is straight in a straddle jump (toetouch) position. 

The jump was invented accidentally, because Herkimer was not able to do an actual side-hurdler. Common misspellings include "hurky" and "herky".

Jump position
In a left herkie, the jumper has the left leg straight in a half-straddle position, and the right leg bent flat beneath them. In a right herkie, it is the opposite. When used as a "signature" at the end of an organized cheer, the jumper typically bends their weaker [leg.

Arm positions
Herkie arm positions depend on how the legs are positioned. A left Herkie has the left arm in a straight up High V motion and the right arm on the right hip. If doing a right Herkie the arm positions are flipped.

References

External links
About.com

Cheerleading